Uzo-Uwani is a Local Government Area of Enugu State, Nigeria bordering Kogi State and Anambra State. Its headquarters is in the town of Umulokpa. It has an area of 855 km and a population of 124,480 at the 2006 census. The postal code of the area is 411.

Invasion
Uzo-Uwani experienced bloody terrorist attack on April 25, 2016 in the Nimbo area. Seven Nimbo villages- Ekwuru, Ngwoko, Ugwuijoro, Ebor, Enugu-Nimbo, Umuome and Ugwuachara were invaded, and scores massacred by over 500 heavily armed Fulani herdsmen, rated the fourth deadliest terror group in the world, in the early hours of April 25, 2016. During the raid, the community's Roman Catholic church was also burnt.

According to Enugu State governor, Ifeanyi Ugwuanyi, the terrorism at Nimbo may have happened due to inability of security agencies to successfully act on the counter intelligence report about herdsmen grouping at neighbouring Odolu in Kogi State in preparation for attack. Attack on Nimbo followed similar attack on Abbi, another Uzo-Uwani community, where a brother and sister-Fidelis and Mercy Okeja were reportedly killed instantly, and 19 persons declared missing whilst seven houses and motocycles were razed down, earlier in February 2016.

References

Local Government Areas in Enugu State
Local Government Areas in Igboland